The Iron Man statue is a figure of an iron miner located at the entrance to the Minnesota Discovery Center  outside of Chisholm, Minnesota. The brass and copper 36' Iron Man is balanced atop a 49' structure of steel and is a tribute to the men who labored in the open pit mines when the mining industry boomed on the Iron Range of northern Minnesota. The work is titled The Emergence of Man Through Steel.

Sculpture

The statue was created by Jack E. Anderson of Lake Linden, Michigan, who also created a Bishop Baraga sculpture in L'Anse, Michigan. Anderson said that the iron worker's posture represented the weariness of a day spent working in mines.
The Ironman's facial features were taken from the miner Daniel Tolonen, an immigrant from Finland who resided in and is buried in Chisholm MN. Daniel Tolonen was present with five generations of his family on the day the statue was dedicated July 4, 1987, along with Governor Rudy Perpich and U.S. Representative James Oberstar among the day's speakers.

See also
Vulcan, the world's largest cast iron statue, in Birmingham, Alabama, also known as Iron Man
Iron: Man, a statue in Birmingham England
List of tallest statues
List of the tallest statues in the United States

References

External links
Chisholm's Iron Man Statue

1987 establishments in Minnesota
1987 sculptures
Colossal statues in the United States
Iron sculptures in the United States
Outdoor sculptures in Minnesota
Statues in Minnesota
Sculptures of men in Minnesota